The Blue Mountains Line (BMT) is an inter urban commuter rail service operated by NSW TrainLink serving the Blue Mountains region of New South Wales, Australia. The line travels west from Sydney to the major town of Katoomba and on to Mount Victoria, Lithgow and Bathurst. Mount Victoria is the terminus for most electric services, but some services terminate at Lithgow instead. Two express services per day in each direction, known as the Bathurst Bullet, extend to the regional city of Bathurst, which is supplemented by road coaches connecting Bathurst to Lithgow. Due to electrification limits at Lithgow, the Bathurst Bullet is run using the Endeavour railcars, which operate on diesel. The Blue Mountains Line operates over a mostly duplicated section of the Main Western line. As such, the tracks are also traversed by the Central West XPT, Outback Xplorer and Indian Pacific passenger services and by freight trains.

History 

The Blue Mountains line is a section of the Main Western line which opened in 1868.

The line originally ascended the eastern and descended the western sides of the Blue Mountains via a series of zig-zag track sections. The eastern zig zag was by passed by a tunnel in 1892 and the western zig zag (currently a tourist railway) was bypassed in 1910 with the Ten Tunnels Deviation.

Electrification and further upgrades

In the 1950s, the line was electrified primarily as a means of easing the haulage of coal freight from the western coalfields to the coastal ports, but a by-product of this programme was the introduction of electric interurban passenger services as far west as Bowenfels, later cut back to Lithgow. Goods trains are now exclusively diesel hauled. Electric passenger services were originally provided by a combination of electric locomotive hauled carriages and single deck electric multiple unit sets (known as U sets), both of which have now been withdrawn and replaced by more modern rolling stock.

In June 2012, New South Wales Premier Barry O'Farrell announced that services would be extended to Bathurst. The service, commonly known as the Bathurst Bullet, commenced on 21 October 2012. A second Bathurst Bullet return service was introduced on 16 September 2019.
Springwood services were previously the only services where an H set train would be scheduled. Due to the width of H sets, they risked striking platforms past Springwood with their outward opening plug doors and tunnels past Katoomba. The last H sets were removed from the line in 2017 and 2018. As the V sets are being replaced by the New Intercity Fleet, which are wider, the loading gauge of the line past Springwood will be increased. This will be done by a combination of carving notches into tunnel walls and reducing required clearances by lowering speed limits.

Station upgrades as part of the Transport Access Program (TAP) were carried out, as well as more minor upgrades. A full list of completed upgrades can be viewed at the TAP's completed projects page, whilst current projects can be viewed here.

Services 

The line is operated entirely by V sets. As the electric overhead wiring ends at Lithgow, diesel Endeavour railcars operate the services to and from Bathurst.

All electric Blue Mountains line services start and terminate from the intercity platforms (4-15) of Central (Sydney Terminal) station. During the weekday off-peak, they operate hourly, alternating between services to Mount Victoria and Lithgow. During the morning and afternoon peaks, some express services operate, together with short workings to Springwood and Katoomba.

There are two services each way from Bathurst to Central, known as the Bathurst Bullet, mainly catering for commuters working in Sydney. Two services run toward Central in the morning and return in the afternoon. Two shuttle services operate from Lithgow to Bathurst in the early morning and return to Lithgow late at night.

Some off-peak electric interurban services on the line only consist of four carriages, with peak hour services usually consisting of eight carriages. Regional diesel services on the line consist of two carriages.

Blue Mountains line stations 

Coach services stop at the following locations:
 Lithgow - connects to trains.
 Wallerawang
 Mount Lambie
 Meadow Flat
 Yetholme
 Raglan
 Kelso
 Bathurst

Patronage

References

External links 
Blue Mountains Railway Pages

Transport in the Blue Mountains (New South Wales)
NSW TrainLink